Phillip Cancar (born 11 May 2001) is an Australian professional soccer player who plays as a central defender for Newcastle Jets.

Club career

Western Sydney Wanderers
In November 2020, Cancar joined Aussie club Western Sydney Wanderers.

Livingston
In May 2022, Cancar joined Scottish club Livingston on a two-year deal, with an option for a third.

Newcastle Jets
Cancar returned to Australia to sign for Newcastle Jets in February 2023.

References

External links

Living people
2001 births
Australian soccer players
Association football defenders
Wollongong Wolves FC players
Sydney FC players
Western Sydney Wanderers FC players
Livingston F.C. players
A-League Men players
National Premier Leagues players
Australian expatriate soccer players
Expatriate footballers in Scotland
Australian expatriate sportspeople in Scotland
Scottish Professional Football League players
Australian people of Croatian descent
Newcastle Jets FC players